Cystodytes is a genus of tunicates belonging to the family Polycitoridae.

The genus has cosmopolitan distribution.

Species:

Cystodytes antarcticus 
Cystodytes dellechiajei 
Cystodytes denudatus 
Cystodytes durus 
Cystodytes fuscus 
Cystodytes guinensis 
Cystodytes inflatus 
Cystodytes lobatus 
Cystodytes luteus 
Cystodytes morifer 
Cystodytes mucosus 
Cystodytes multipapillatus 
Cystodytes philippinensis 
Cystodytes planus 
Cystodytes punctatus 
Cystodytes ramosus 
Cystodytes roseolus 
Cystodytes rufus 
Cystodytes semicataphractus 
Cystodytes senegalense 
Cystodytes solitus 
Cystodytes variabilis 
Cystodytes violatinctus

References

Tunicates